Stralsund – Nordvorpommern – Rügen was an electoral constituency (German: Wahlkreis) represented in the German Bundestag from 1990 to 2013. Part of the state of Mecklenburg-Vorpommern, the constituency elected one representative under the mixed member proportional representation (MMP) system. Under the current constituency numbering system, it was designated as constituency 15. The constituency was abolished as part of the 2012 federal boundary review, which saw the state of Mecklenburg-Vorpommern lose one of its 7 geographic constituencies as a result of population change. It was largely replaced with the Vorpommern-Rügen – Vorpommern-Greifswald I constituency, which took its district number of 15.

Members of the Bundestag
The constituency has been held since its creation in 1990 by the CDU's Angela Merkel, Federal Chancellor since 2005. In the 2009 federal election, Merkel won the seat by 23 percentage points over her nearest opponent.

Election results

2009 election
The following table does not list parties which did not contest or gain constituency votes.

References

Federal electoral districts in Mecklenburg-Western Pomerania
Stralsund
Rügen
1990 establishments in Germany
2013 disestablishments in Germany
Constituencies established in 1990
Constituencies disestablished in 2013